Qaryaghdi (also Romanized as Qāryāghdī; also known as Qāryāqdī and Qāryāqhdī) is a village in Zarrineh Rud-e Shomali Rural District, in the Central District of Miandoab County, West Azerbaijan Province, Iran. At the 2006 census, its population was 1,821, in 451 families.

References 

Populated places in Miandoab County